Tjoarvekrajgge or Čoarvvekraigi is a cave in the Bonådalen valley in the municipality of Sørfold in Nordland county, Norway.

References

Caves of Norway
Karst caves
Landforms of Nordland
Sørfold